Sonbarsa is a big village in Ballia District, Uttar Pradesh, India situated around 39 km from the main city in East direction. The village is connected to the city of Ballia by Bairia Road. Its geographical coordinates are .Sonbarsa has an established Gram Panchayat. The village has a pin code of 277208 for postal references.

Chak Girdhar 2km, Bhikha Chhapra 2km, Kotwal 3km, Gonniya Chhapra 3km, Bairia 0.5 km, Bhojapur 1 km are nearby villages to sonbarsa. Sonbarsa is surrounded by Bairia block toward west, Chakki Block toward south, Shahpur Block toward south, Roti Block toward west.

The geographical location of the village of Sonbarsa 
In the eastern part of Uttar Pradesh, Mahanadi Sarjoo and Ganga's doaba. They are now the eastern gate of the Ballia district. In the same Doab, the district Ballia One of the most famous village is Sonbarsa. It is said and blossomed. By seeing the text, it also appears that where the village of Sonbarasa is situated. First was the confluence of Mahanad Saraju and Ganga. There was a Shiva fish on the Sangam, where Chaitrasudi used to make a big fair every year.

Sonbarsa 2011 Census detail 

Sonbarsa local Language is Bhojpuri and hindi. Village total population is 20735 and Female population is 46.6% and Village literacy rate is 69.3%.

Historical background 
This left land of Ganges River has been called 'Gangaravarar in old articles and documents of government and jurisdiction'. This land is very fertile. In this land, gold is born as a crop. It seems that the name of the Sonbarsa village in this Gangaraj would have started to be called       sonbarsa. The area of mound of Sonbarasa village is 3500 acres. Its population is around twenty thousand. A common gathering of such a large population is the Sonbarasa. Sonbarsa Mauje Bhagwanpur, Jogindarigiri's Matthia, Choubey's Dalki, Lalganj, Tolksevak Rai, Pritam Chhapra, Daman Tola, Shivpur Deir, Ramnagar Dalan Chapra villages, which are the Upgaon of Sonbarasa. To capture this paired land of the Ganges river, the ancestors of the Kshatriyas of Sonbarsa village came from Kudaria village of Aara district of Bihar from across the Ganges. Their arrival would have occurred in the early 16th century. Life of Sonbarsa started around 400 years of life. First came Mr. Hulas Rai from the village of Kudaria, who made a solid well to drink water. This well is still in the right condition and is called by the name of the well of Hulas Rai. After that, Shri Dhyana Rai came from the village of Kuria to come to this land of the Gangwar land. The descendants of Shri Dhyan Rai are spread across the village of South Tola, North Tola and Tola Sevak Rai of Sonbarsa village. The genealogy of Shri Dhyana Rai has now been split into nearly 500 families.

External links
 Geographical details of sonbarsa village
 List of schools in rural Ballia
 Sonbarsa as a venue on foursquare

Villages in Ballia district